Saloi is a village, union council, and administrative subdivision of Chakwal District in the Punjab Province of Pakistan. It is part of Choa Saidan Shah Tehsil.

Location 
Saloi is located 35 km southeast of Chakwal, Pakistan. It has a total population of 2,800. It is located in between mountains.

It was founded by Mehmood Ghazni around a thousand years ago. The local language spoken in Saloi is Punjabi. The economy is based around agriculture.

Villages in union council 
Golepur Union Councils is subdivided into 8 Villages.
 Chanyana
 Kandla
 Kussak
 Mohra
 Ratuchah
 Saloi
 Takwan
 Wahali

References

Union councils of Chakwal District
Villages in Chakwal District